Apostolos Liolidis (born 13 August 1977) is a Greek retired footballer who last played for Ilioupoli. He has previously played for Aris, Atalanta, Alzano Virescit, Panionios and Niki Volos, as well as the Greek national side.

External links

1977 births
Living people
Greek footballers
Greece international footballers
Greek expatriate footballers
Expatriate footballers in Italy
Super League Greece players
Serie A players
Aris Thessaloniki F.C. players
Panionios F.C. players
Atalanta B.C. players
Virtus Bergamo Alzano Seriate 1909 players
Association football forwards
Footballers from Thessaloniki